John Ernest Hill (27 September 1867 – 2 December 1963) was an English cricketer. He was a right-handed batsman who bowled left-arm medium pace. He was born at Handsworth, Warwickshire.

Hill made his first-class debut for Warwickshire against Nottinghamshire in 1894 at Trent Bridge. He made 24 further first-class appearances for the county, the last of which came against Leicestershire at Edgbaston in the 1898 County Championship. In his 25 first-class matches for the county, he scored 665 runs at an average of 22.16, with a high score of 139 not out. This score, which was his only century, came against Nottinghamshire in his debut match. He also made a single first-class appearance each for the South against the North in 1894 and for Midland Counties against the touring Australians in 1896.

He died at Smethwick, Staffordshire, on 2 December 1963. His brother, Henry, played first-class cricket, as did his nephew Alfred Hill.

References

External links
John Hill at ESPNcricinfo

1867 births
1963 deaths
Cricketers from Birmingham, West Midlands
English cricketers of 1890 to 1918
English cricketers
Warwickshire cricketers
North v South cricketers
Midland Counties cricketers
Cricketers from Handsworth, West Midlands